The Bank of the Republic of Haiti (BRH) is the central bank of Haiti. It was formed in 1979 from the National Bank of the Republic of Haiti, which had served as the country's bank of issue since 1910, itself succeeding the National Bank of Haiti. 

The bank is active in promoting financial inclusion policy and is a member institution of the Alliance for Financial Inclusion. It recently announced a Maya Declaration Commitment to continue with the modernization of the payment system, and submit legislation to regulate and supervise micro finance institutions to relevant authorities in 2013.

Background

The oldest reference to a bank in Haiti can be attributed to a short correspondence exchanged during September 1825 between a foreign tradesman, Nicholas Kane, the Secretary of State Balthazar Inginac about a proposal made by George Clark in the name of a German group, Hermann Hendrick and Co., to establish a bank in Haiti. However, the proposal was never accepted, and Hermann Hendrick and Co. was never established.

A Haitian law of 1880 allowed for a currency issuance concession to be granted to a privileged bank, and the National Bank of Haiti was subsequently established in Paris in early 1881 by the French bank Crédit Industriel et Commercial. In October 1910, the issuance concession was transferred to a new bank, the National Bank of the Republic of Haiti (BNRH) formed by a consortium of French, German and American interests. The National City Bank of New York took over the BNRH following the United States occupation of Haiti, and gained full ownership in 1919. In 1935, the Haitian government acquired the BNRH from National City Bank.

Governors
Antonio André, September 1979 - July 1980
Gérard Martineau, July 1980 - February 1982
Marcel Léger, February 1982 - July 1982
Antonio André, July 1982 - April 1983
Allan Nolté, April 1983 - June 1985
Jean Claude Sanon, June 1985 - February 1986
Onill Millet, February 1986 - June 1988
Hubert Cameau, administrator, June 1988 - August 1988
Joseph Lagroue, director, August 1988 - September 1988
Ernest Ricot, September 1988 - June 1989
Jacques Vilgrain, June 1989 - March 1990
Serge Pothel, March 1990 - August 1990
Charles Beaulieu, August 1990 - April 1991
Roger Pérodin, April 1991 - December 1991
Bonivert Claude, December 1991 - October 1994
Roger Pérodin, October 1994 - December 1994
Leslie Delatour, December 1994 - February 1998
Fritz Jean, February 1998 - August 2001
Venel Joseph, August 2001 - April 2004
Raymond Magloire, April 2004 - September 2007
Charles Castel, September 2007 - December 2015
Jean Baden Dubois, December 2015 -
Source:

See also
Economy of Haiti
Haitian gourde

References

External links
Official site of Bank of the Republic of Haiti 

Banks of Haiti
Haiti
Economy of Haiti
1979 establishments in Haiti
Banks established in 1979